The 2001 Ball Hockey World Championship was the fourth ball hockey world championship held by ISBHF in Toronto, Canada. Canada won their second title.

Group A

Group B

Play off

Semifinals

Bronze medal game

Final 

Ball Hockey World Championship
Ball Hockey World Championship